Lindi Municipal District is one of the eight administrative districts of Lindi Region in Tanzania. The district covers an area of .The district is comparable in size to the land area of the nation state of Sao Tome and Principe.  It is entirely bordered on land by Lindi District and its faces the Indian Ocean to the east. Lindi Municipal District hosts the region's capital is located in the ward of Ndoro in the town of Lindi. According to the 2012 census, the district has a total population of 78,841.

Administrative Divisions
The Lindi District is administratively divided into 18 wards.

Wards

 Chikonji
 Jamhuri
 Makonde
 Matopeni
 Mbanja
 Mikumbi
 Mingoyo
 Mitandi
 Msanjahili

 Mtanda
 Mwenge
 Nachingwea
 Ndoro
 Ng'apa
 Rahaleo
 Rasbura
 Tandangongoro
 Wailes

Education & Health 
As of 2022, there were 89 Schools in Lindi Municipal District, 72 of are primary schools and 17 are secondary schools.
In Terms of Healthcare facilities, as of 2022 Lindi district is home to 36 healthcare facilities namely; 32 clinics and 4 heath centers.

References

Districts of Lindi Region